was a village located in Higashitsugaru District in central Aomori Prefecture, Japan. The former town was best known as a shukuba along the Matsumaedō and the site of an onsen town, Asamushi Onsen. It is now a neighborhood of the city, Aomori.

History
Nonai was created by a merger of the villages of Asamushi and Kugurizaka on April 1, 1889. The village was annexed by Aomori on October 1, 1962.

Neighbouring municipalities
These were the neighboring municipalities of Nonai just before its incorporation into Aomori.
Aomori
Hiranai

Transportation
Matsumaedō – a sub-route of the Ōshū Kaidō; today it exists roughly along . The old route, signed as Aomori Prefecture Route 259, is still the main road through Nonai. Route 4 largely bypasses the neighborhood.
 Japan National Railways
Tōhoku Main Line – currently  Aoimori Railway Line
Nonai Station – the station was moved 1.5 km to the southwest in 2011.
Asamushi-Onsen Station
Aomori City Bus – the Aomori municipal bus is headquartered in Nonai.

References

Dissolved municipalities of Aomori Prefecture